New.net was an alternative DNS root system which is enabled via NewDotNet, a DNS hijacker application, which is usually bundled with legitimate software. The top-level domains New.net provided include: .agent, .arts, .auction, .chat, .church, .club, .family, .free, .game, .golf, .inc, .law, .llc, .llp, .love, .ltd, .med, .mp3, .school, .scifi, .shop, .soc, .sport, .tech, and .video At one point it offered .travel, .kids, and .xxx but those were removed when they conflicted with domains proposed to ICANN in the first round of creation of new domain names in the primary root since the early history of the DNS. Alternate access to domains registered under New.net's alternative TLDs is provided by third level domains under the new.net domain name space (e.g., example.shop is actually example.shop.new.net).  As of early 2012, New.net seems to have ceased operation, as the web site "new.net" is no longer resolving; ICANN would allow official registrations of new, non-standard top-level domains the same year.

Adware
New.net distributed NewDotNet, an Internet Explorer plugin for Windows that enables the browser to access sites that use these unofficial domain names. It is considered as adware and spyware by McAfee Site Advisor. In a poll of readers of ICANN Watch, New.Net was considered the greatest threat to the security of the DNS as matched against other alternatives.

Several different versions of NewDotNet exist. Early versions installed themselves into the Windows directory as a DLL named "newdotnet" followed by a version number, and had no uninstall option. More recent versions create a folder in the Program Files folder. A version introduced in 2002 (since discontinued) included a pop-up advertising component.

The program functions by inserting itself into the Winsock system, which can in some situations disrupt network connectivity. Well-known and generally trusted anti-spyware programs like Ad-Aware and Spybot are usually effective at removing older versions of this software. More recent versions of NewDotNet can be uninstalled using the standard Windows "Add/Remove Programs" control panel or an uninstaller in "C:\Program Files\New.net". Manual removal, if performed incorrectly, can completely disrupt the computer's ability to access the internet. This can be fixed with an LSP Fix program.

Lawsuit
On 6 May 2003 New.net filed a federal lawsuit in the Central District Court of California against Lavasoft, distributor of Ad-Aware. Their claims against Lavasoft of false advertising, unfair competition, trade libel, and tortious interference were stricken and dismissed with prejudice the following year.

Legal controversy
NewDotNet has been implicated as the cause of a controversial 2007 criminal trial which received international media coverage. In State of Connecticut v. Julie Amero, a substitute teacher was arrested after students in her 7th Grade class reported that they had seen pornographic images on her computer screen. Amero said the computer would not stop sending pop-ups and that she did not know what to do with the computer.

Amero was convicted on four counts of risk of injury to a minor, or impairing the morals of a child, and faced up to 40 years in prison. The state Supreme Court overturned the conviction and ordered a new trial, but Amero instead pleaded guilty to the lesser charge of disorderly conduct and had her Connecticut teaching credentials revoked. A subsequent forensic analysis revealed that the uncontrollable pornographic popups were propagated by NewDotNet.

See also
 Kazaa

Sources

External links
 homepage
 Factual information about NewDotNet software Backup from the Internet Archive
 Detailed criticism of New.net and its plugin Backup from the Internet Archive

Adware
Alternative Internet DNS services